Enoch Jones House, also known as "Boxwood," is a historic home located near Clayton, Kent County, Delaware. It dates to the mid-18th century, and consists of a two-story, three bay, brick main house with a lower two-story frame west wing. The house is in the hall-and-parlor plan. It has a gable roof on both sections.  The first documented reference to the house is a 1792 survey of Enoch Jones 717-acre estate.

It was added to the National Register of Historic Places in 1973.

References

Houses on the National Register of Historic Places in Delaware
Houses completed in 1855
Houses in Kent County, Delaware
National Register of Historic Places in Kent County, Delaware